Khawzar (also spelt Khawsa) is a town located in Mawlamyine District, Mon State of Myanmar. It is also a sub-township in Ye Township. It is protected from the sea by a  hill and the  Mount Pawdaing rises to the east.

References

Township capitals of Myanmar
Populated places in Mon State
Old Cities of Mon people